Vidoje Žarković (Plužine, 10 June 1927 – Beograd, 29 September 2000) was a communist politician from Socialist Republic of Montenegro.

Biography
He was a chairman of the Executive Council of Montenegro (1967–69), president of the People's Assembly of Montenegro (1969–74), member of the Presidency of SFR Yugoslavia (1979–1984), secretary of the Central Committee of the League of Communists of Montenegro (1984), and president of the Presidium of the League of Communists of Yugoslavia (1985–86).

References

Presidents of Montenegro
1927 births
2000 deaths
Yugoslav Partisans members
League of Communists of Montenegro politicians
Presidency of the Socialist Federal Republic of Yugoslavia members
Members of the Federal Council for Protection of the Constitutional Order (Yugoslavia)
Montenegrin communists
Admirals of the Yugoslav People's Army
Recipients of the Order of the Hero of Socialist Labour